The 1966–67 Egyptian Premier League, was the 17th season of the Egyptian Premier League, the top Egyptian professional league for association football clubs, since its establishment in 1948. The season started on 30 September 1966 and concluded on 7 May 1967.
Ismaily managed to win the league for the first time in the club's history.

League table

 (C)= Champion, (R)= Relegated, Pld = Matches played; W = Matches won; D = Matches drawn; L = Matches lost; F = Goals for; A = Goals against; ± = Goal difference; Pts = Points.

Top goalscorers

Teams

References

External links 
 All Egyptian Competitions Info

5
1966–67 in African association football leagues
1966–67 in Egyptian football